The Battle of Slivnitsa was a victory of the Bulgarian army over the Serbians on 17–19 November 1885 in the Serbo-Bulgarian War. It solidified the unification between the Kingdom of Bulgaria and Eastern Rumelia.

Background
The conclusion of the Russo-Turkish War (1877-1878) and the Congress of Berlin 1878 left Bulgaria divided into two sections. The area north of the Balkan Mountains and Sofia became an autonomous principality. Eastern Rumelia between the Balkan and Rhodope mountains gained semi-autonomous status with an Ottoman appointed Christian governor.

The Bulgarian Assembly chose Prince Alexander Battenberg as their ruler and continued to press for the reunification of their country. Political changes in 1883 caused a cooling in relations between Bulgaria and their protector Russia, who now opposed reunification.

In September 1885 a rebellion broke out in Eastern Rumelia. Alexander was placed in a difficult position. Russian opposition if he supported the revolt, or the loss of his throne unless he retained leadership of the Bulgarian national movement. He decided to keep his throne. In response the Russians recalled all their officers which left the Bulgarian army virtually leaderless above the rank of captain.

The Bulgarian army concentrated their limited forces in Eastern Rumelia, expecting an Ottoman attack that never materialised. The actual threat came from the west in the shape of King Milan's Serbia. Bulgarian unification upset the balance of power in the Balkans and Milan demanded compensation.

The Armies
The Bulgarian field army in 1885 consisted of just under 30,000 men organised into 8 three-battalion infantry regiments (700 men each), 9 squadrons of cavalry and 12 eight-gun batteries. In addition, the first line of the Eastern Rumelia militia had been mobilised consisting of 12 infantry battalions, 2 squadrons of cavalry, and 4 guns. During the war the second ban of the Eastern Rumelia militia was mobilised (12 battalions) along with the Bulgarian second ban (8 battalions) and as many as 20 volunteer battalions, 3 Macedonian battalions, and some 6,000 Muslim volunteers.  The army was short of senior officers. 

Confident of an easy victory and to some extent recognising that the war was not popular in Serbia, Milan only mobilised the active (first ban) army. This gave a field army of 5 divisions consisting of 80 battalions (700 men each), 21 cavalry squadrons and 46 batteries: a total of 70,000 men and 264 guns. In fact, only 49 battalions and 23 batteries were ready for the invasion, the rest, along with elements of the second ban, only became available in the last stage of the war. A key weakness was the limited number of modern Krupp and du Bange guns.

The Opening Moves
Serbia declared war on 13 November 1885 and crossed the lightly defended north-western border in three columns. The main army advanced in the centre (Šumadija, Danube and Drina divisions). To the south went the Morava division and to the north the Timok division. The plan was to break through the Bulgarian defences and concentrate four divisions before Sofia.

In response Alexander had to move his army from Eastern Rumelia to Sofia by all means available including the one limited railway line. One infantry regiment marched 95 km in 32 hours. The light Bulgarian forces on the Serbian border succeeded in slowing the Serbian advance in mountainous terrain which favoured the defence. Gradually reinforcements arrived at the previously prepared defensive position at Slivnitsa, 30 km north-west of Sofia.

Slivnitsa 17/19 November 1885
Alexander arrived on the evening of the 16th to find a well prepared defensive position manned by 9 battalions, plus some 2,000 volunteers and 32 guns, commanded by Major Guchev. The position consisted of nearly 4 km of trenches and artillery redoubts either side of the main road on a ridge in front of Slivnitsa village. To the right was steep mountainous terrain whilst the left wing had the easier Visker Hills towards Breznik.

The three Serbian centre divisions also arrived on the 16th and halted to recover after the fierce Bulgarian delaying action in the Dragoman Pass. The Morava division was at Tran some distance from its objective Bresnik to the south. The northern advance was bogged down along the Danube.

The morning of the 17th came with rain and mist but not the expected Serbian attack. By 10am Alexander ordered three battalions to advance on the right. They surprised the Danube division who eventually rallied and pushed them back. The main Serbian attack began on the centre largely unsupported by artillery which had insufficient range. The weight of Bulgarian fire forced them back with some 1,200 casualties. A relief column led by Captain Benderev recaptured the heights on the right and forced the Danube division back to the road.

At daybreak on the 18th the Serbians attacked the weaker left flank of the Bulgarian line. Just in time two battalions of the Preslav Regiment arrived to shore up the position. Further attacks in the centre were repulsed with heavy Serbian casualties and Benderev captured two further positions in the mountains.

On the 19th the Serbians concentrated two divisions for an attack on the Bulgarian left near Karnul (today Delyan, Sofia Province) in an attempt to join up with the Morava division. However, three battalions of Bulgarian troops led by Captain Popov from Sofia had held the Morava division in the Visker Hills and the flanking move failed. Alexander now ordered a counterattack which pushed the Serbians back on both flanks although nightfall prevented a complete collapse.

The Bulgarians Advance
Slivnitsa was the decisive battle of the war. The Serbians fought only limited rearguard actions as they retreated and by 24 November they were back in Serbia. The Timok division in the north continued the siege of Vidin until 29 November.

The main Bulgarian army crossed the border in two strong divisions (Guchev and Nikolaev) supported by flanking columns and converged on Pirot. The Serbian army dug in on the heights west of the town. On 27 November the Bulgarian army flanked the right of the Serbian position with Prince Alexander personally leading the final attack. The Serbians were defeated and fled to Niš.

On the 28th the Austrians intervened and a ceasefire was agreed. Serbian casualties totalled 6,800 compared to 2,300 Bulgarians. Serbian sources state that the casualties in this battle totalled 3,000 for the Serbs vs 2,500 for the Bulgarians, and 7,000 for the Serbs vs 5,000 for the Bulgarians in the whole war. The Treaty of Bucharest 1886 effectively confirmed the unification of Bulgaria. Unfortunately for Prince Alexander, Russia continued to oppose his reign and he was deposed by the Russophile officers in August 1886.

References 
 B. Jelavich, History of the Balkans (Vol1), Cambridge 1983
 H.S. White, An Account of the Servo-Bulgarian War 1885, Pallas Armata reprint
 A. Von Huhn, The Struggle of the Bulgarians for National Independence, London 1886
 A. Koch, Prince Alexander of Battenberg, London 1887
 G.C. Wynne, Servo-Bulgarian war Collection (1885), British War Office
 W.H Cromie, The Military forces of the Balkan Peninsula, Pallas Armata reprint

This article plus maps was  also published in The Foreign Correspondent, the journal of the Continental Wars Society.

Slivnitsa
Slivnitsa 1885
Slivnitsa 1885
1885 in Bulgaria
Slivnitsa
History of Sofia Province
November 1885 events